Released in late 2016, Ophidian 2360 is an customizable, expandable card game that is non-collectible. It is the continuation of the Ophidian Universe, created by Ophidian Games in 2003. Ophidian 2360 is produced by Hack and Slash Games. It uses a play structure called Momentum rather than the normal turn-based system typically used in competitive card games.

Ophidian lore 
Ophidian 2360 takes place in the year 2360, where a strange reptilian race known as Ophidians run gladitorial arenas for humans, aliens and demons alike. Combat consists of one Gladiator team pitted against others, for the entertainment of the masses.  The true motives of the Ophidians is unknown, but many suspect a nefarious ulterior motive.

Gameplay 
Each player's team is made up of up to four gladiators, made up of any VP (Victory Point) combination that adds up to exactly 10. A player can win either by defeating an opponent's Gladiators, by defeating Gladiators worth a greater number of victory points after four Waves (rounds) or by amassing 15 points worth of Cheer from the audience.

Each side of the table is divided up into an Action Field, where powerful Gladiators can Attack and protect others from Attacks, and a Support Field, where less powerful Gladiators and supporting Minions usually reside. Between Waves, cards can move between the two Fields as needed.

Some of the game mechanics are recognizable from previous games such as Magic: The Gathering - cards are "Set" when activated, being rotated ninety degrees to show that they have been used, which is identical to "tapping" in Magic. However, the turns of previous CCGs are not present in Ophidian, instead replaced by Momentum.

Card games introduced in 2016